Bremen Town Musicians is a public art work by artist Gerhard Marcks located at the Lynden Sculpture Garden near Milwaukee, Wisconsin. The bronze sculpture is based on the fairytale by the Brothers Grimm; it is installed on the garden's lawn.

It is made up of a donkey, dog, cat, and rooster, each stacked on top of each other and smaller than the last. Some notable characteristics of this work are the hump of the cat's back and the minimalist expression of the character's eyes.

References

1950s establishments in Wisconsin
1951 sculptures
Bronze sculptures in Wisconsin
Dogs in art
Mammals in art
Outdoor sculptures in Milwaukee
Sculptures of birds in the United States
Statues in Wisconsin
Statues of fictional characters
Cats in art